These Arms of Mine may refer to:
 These Arms of Mine (Otis Redding song), released in 1962
 These Arms of Mine (LeAnn Rimes song), released in 1998
 These Arms of Mine (TV series), a Canadian television drama series in the 2000–01 season
 These Arms of Mine (Grey's Anatomy), an episode of the television drama series Grey's Anatomy.